The Ministry of Governance and Territorial Development (Spanish: Ministerio de Gobernación y Desarrollo Territorial) of El Salvador is a state institution whose mission is to "guarantee governance and provide services for the benefit of the population through preventive actions and participatory organization, integrating institutional efforts to improve the quality of life of all people".

Ministers 

 Mario Edgardo Durán Gavidia (Cabinet of Nayib Bukele)

References 
Interior ministers
Ministries of El Salvador
Internal affairs ministries